The following is a list of unsuccessful terrorist plots in the post-9/11 United States.  After the initiation of the War on Terrorism following the attacks of September 11, 2001, several terrorist plots aimed at civilian and military targets have failed to succeed.  Many such terrorism plots were created by the United States Federal Bureau of Investigation, with agents providing plans, materials, and encouragement to the supposed "terrorists" — often mentally unstable individuals, small-time criminals, and other vulnerable targets — and then arresting them on terrorism charges.

George W. Bush administration (first term)

George W. Bush administration (second term)

Barack Obama administration (first term)

Barack Obama administration (second term)

Donald Trump administration

See also
 Terrorism in the United States
 List of thwarted Islamic terrorist attacks

References

Further reading
 New America Foundation: Homegrown Terrorism Cases, 2001-2013
 List Of Foiled Terrorist Plots Since 9/11, wcbstv.com, 2007-06-03, Retrieved 2008-01-13
 James Jay Carafano, U.S. Thwarts 19 Terrorist Attacks Against America Since 9/11, The Heritage Foundation, 2007-11-13, Retrieved 2009-12-30
 Detroit Terror Plot Makes 28 Plots Foiled Since 9/11, The Heritage Foundation, 2009-12-26, Retrieved 2009-12-30

21st century-related lists
Aftermath of the September 11 attacks
 
Lists of terrorist incidents in the United States
Terrorism in the United States
Terrorist incidents in the 21st century
Terrorist incidents in the United States in the 2000s
Terrorist incidents in the United States in the 2010s
Terrorist incidents in the United States in the 2020s
War on terror